Shirabad (also Romanized as Shīrābād) is a village in Nazlu-e Shomali Rural District, Nazlu District, Urmia County, West Azerbaijan Province, Iran. The village's name means "place of lions." At the 2006 census, its population was 143, in 40 families.

The village was exclusively inhabited by Assyrians until the Assyrian genocide. As of 2012, only two Assyrian families remain in the village. Shirabad had four churches, and only two are still in use, one of which is the Church of Mar Talya.

See also
 Assyrians in Iran
 List of Assyrian settlements

References 

Populated places in Urmia County
Assyrian settlements